Edwin Bruton Peacock III (born March 6, 1970) is an American politician from North Carolina. He is a member of the Republican Party and was one of Charlotte's four At-Large City Council members, the only Republican elected to the post in 2009. He is also an active member of the Charlotte Downtown Rotary, a board member of Carolina's Freedom Foundation, on the Charlotte Country Day School Alumni Board, a graduate of Leadership Charlotte, and a member of Myers Park Presbyterian Church. He and his wife, Amy, have two children.

On April 5, 2013, Peacock announced his candidacy to become Mayor of Charlotte. He told the Charlotte Observer, "We have many important issues before us that will shape our city’s future for decades. I’m eager to serve our community." He lost the 2013 election to Democrat Patrick Cannon.

Biography 
Peacock was an at-large representative on Charlotte City Council. He was first elected in 2007 and is serving his second term on Council.  He chairs the  Environment Committee and is a member of the Budget and Community Safety committees.  He is the council representative to the Charlotte-Mecklenburg Development Corporation.

He received his bachelor's degree in political science and a certificate of Global Studies from the University of Georgia. He is a graduate of Charlotte Country Day School. He is also a graduate of the Leadership Charlotte program. Peacock achieved the Charter Life Underwriter designation from the American College, Bryn Mawr, Pennsylvania, in 2006.

Peacock serves on the board of the Carolina's Freedom Foundation. He is active in the Charlotte Downtown Rotary and a supporter of ALS/Lou Gehrig's Disease causes.

He is vice president of The Pomfret Financial Company, Inc. His firm primarily represents Northwestern Mutual Financial Network. He serves as a financial representative and field director for Northwestern.

Charlotte Mayoral Election, 2015 

Peacock defeated Scott Stone in the Republican primaries on September 15, 2015. He lost to Democratic nominee Jennifer Roberts in the general election on November 3, 2015 in the Charlotte, NC mayoral election.

References

External links 
 Official Website
 
 

1970 births
Living people
Charlotte, North Carolina City Council members
North Carolina Republicans
University of Georgia alumni